Presidential elections are scheduled to be held in Madagascar in 2023.

Electoral system 
The President of Madagascar is elected using the two-round system; if no candidate receives a majority of the vote in the first round, a run-off will be held.

References

External links
 UN reluctant to fund presidential election, Africa Intelligence, February 23, 2023 (requires free registration)

Madagascar
Presidential elections in Madagascar
2023 in Madagascar